Brian L. White (born February 7, 1976) is an American former professional ice hockey defenseman who played two games in the National Hockey League with the Colorado Avalanche.

Playing career
White was selected 268th overall by the Tampa Bay Lightning in the 1994 NHL Entry Draft, He had a four-year collegiate career at the University of Maine before signing with the Colorado Avalanche and playing 2 games in the NHL in the 1998–99 NHL season. Spending the next two years with Hershey Bears in the minor leagues, White was then signed by the Mighty Ducks of Anaheim on August 14, 2001. He never had another chance to play in the NHL, and after the 2003–04 season he left for the Iserlohn Roosters of the DEL.

Career statistics

References

External links

1976 births
American men's ice hockey defensemen
Cincinnati Mighty Ducks players
Colorado Avalanche players
Hershey Bears players
Ice hockey players from Massachusetts
Iserlohn Roosters players
Kalamazoo Wings (2007–2009) players
Living people
Long Beach Ice Dogs (ECHL) players
People from Winchester, Massachusetts
Providence Bruins players
Sportspeople from Middlesex County, Massachusetts
Tampa Bay Lightning draft picks
Tappara players
Worcester Sharks players